Number One, also released as Woman Up! in the United Kingdom and the United States, is a 2017 French drama film directed by Tonie Marshall, her last film before her 2020 death. It was screened in the Special Presentations section at the 2017 Toronto International Film Festival.

Background 
According to Marshall, the original idea of Number One was back in 2009 for a series that follows eight women leaders working in industry, politics, media, and sports. However, no TV Channel was interested. In 2017, she recovered the idea for a feature film. She reduced the number of characters and focused on just one women, Emmanuelle Blachey.

For the film, Marshall researched the female corporative world through in-depth discussions.

Synopsis 
Emmanuelle Blachey (Emmanuelle Devos) is an ambitious corporate manager that aspires to become the first managing director of a major French company. However, she faces vicious sexism.

Cast
 Emmanuelle Devos as Emmanuelle Blachey
 Suzanne Clément as Véra Jacob
 Richard Berry as Jean Beaumel
 Sami Frey as Henri Blachey
 Benjamin Biolay as Marc Ronsin
 Francine Bergé as Adrienne Postel-Devaux
 Bernard Verley as Jean Archambault
 John Lynch as Gary Adams

Reception
On review aggregator website Rotten Tomatoes, the film holds an approval rating of 100%, based on 11 reviews, and an average rating of 7.5/10.

References

External links
 

2017 films
2017 drama films
French drama films
2010s French-language films
French feminist films
Films directed by Tonie Marshall
2010s French films